Maximilien Jazani (born in Iran) is the son of Bijan Jazani and a French lawyer at the Paris Bar and human rights advocate.

Childhood and Education

Maximilien Jazani was born in Teheran in the second half of the 1960s in an intellectual and agnostic family (see Bijan Jazani). As a child, he went to the modern method and agnostic]] primary Farhad school in Teheran and started his first "college" in Alborz when Mohammad Reza Shah's regime was reversed and the Islamic Republic of Iran started oppressing democrats, agnostics and secularists in Iran. He had to leave Iran together with his mother and his brother and to come in France. 
In France, he went to "college" and high school (Lycée) and obtained a “baccalaureat” of French litters philosophy and mathematics.
He then went to the Paris University of Law. He very soon won the First Prize of Constitutional Law and obtained a Master (DESS) of Business and Taxation Law from Paris Pantheon Assas Law University.

Human Rights Advocacy

In 1997 Jazani became a member of the Association of the Business Lawyers (ACE). He was elected president of the Human Rights Commission of ACE in 1997 and 1998. He participated in the great reform of the French Criminal Procedure in 1998, was received by the Minister of Justice, Élisabeth Guigou and made 9 proposals for the reform of the French Criminal Procedure Code. He proposed to allow the Defense Lawyer to be  assisted by a Private Investigator (7th Proposal) and to have the right to request from the examining judge (Juge d'instruction") to perform acts he judges useful for the search of the truth (4th Proposal). The 4th proposal was accepted by the government and was adopted by the Legislator and became the new 1st section article 82-1 of the French Criminal Procedure Code.

Jazani also participated in the works for the institution of the International Penal Court. He advocated for the protection of the Lawyers’ secrecy (client's privilege) always in the perspective of the improvement of the arms length procedure.
He advocated for the remitting of the Paris Bar Medal to the Nobel Peace Prize Shirin Ebadi on March 8, 2005.
Maximilien Jazani focused his advocacy in human rights in the area of the improvement of the Defense rights in all kind of procedure (Criminal procedure, tax procedure, ... ).

Publications

Jazani has published numerous articles in the matters of Human Rights, taxation and Music and Live show.

The Best Young Business Lawyer Contest

Maximilien Jazani created in 1999 a contest called the Best Young  Business Lawyer Contest ("Trophée du Meilleur Jeune Avocat Conseil d’Entreprises) which is still organized by ACE.

References

20th-century French lawyers
Iranian human rights activists
French human rights activists
Living people
Iranian emigrants to France
Iranian people of French descent
1960s births
21st-century French lawyers